Grevillea gillivrayi is a shrub or small tree in the family Proteacae. It is endemic to New Caledonia.

The species grows up to 10 metres in height It is a manganese accumulator.

References

gillivrayi
Endemic flora of New Caledonia
Taxa named by William Jackson Hooker